The Europeans is a 2020 Spanish romantic comedy film directed by Víctor García León, starring Raúl Arévalo and Juan Diego Botto.

The film was nominated for three Goya Awards and four Feroz Awards.

Cast
 Raúl Arévalo as Miguel Alonso
 Juan Diego Botto as Antonio
 Stéphane Caillard as Odette
 Carolina Lapausa as Vicen
 Dritan Biba as Dimitri
 Boris Ruiz as Matín Ojeda
Aida Ballmann as Erika

Awards

References

External links
 

2020 films
2020s Spanish-language films
2020 romantic comedy films
Spanish romantic comedy films
Films directed by Víctor García León
2020s Spanish films